Daniel Keating (1846 – June 20, 1912) was a United States Army soldier who received the U.S. military's highest decoration, the Medal of Honor, for his actions in the Indian Wars of the western United States.

Biography
Keating was born in 1846 in County Cork, Ireland. He served during the Indian Wars as a corporal in Company M of the 6th Cavalry Regiment. During a pursuit of Native Americans at the Wichita River in Texas on October 5, 1870, Keating showed "[g]allantry in action." He was awarded the Medal of Honor a month later, on November 19, 1870. Five other men also received the medal for this action: Sergeant Michael Welch, Corporal Samuel Bowden, Private James Anderson, Private Benjamin Wilson, and civilian guide James B. Doshier.

Keating's official Medal of Honor citation reads:
Gallantry in action and in pursuit of Indians.

Keating died on June 20, 1912, at age 65 or 66 and was buried in Malden, Massachusetts.

References

External links 
 

1846 births
1912 deaths
People from County Cork
United States Army soldiers
United States Army Medal of Honor recipients
American Indian Wars recipients of the Medal of Honor
Irish-born Medal of Honor recipients